Pennisetia marginata, the raspberry crown borer or blackberry clearwing borer, is a moth of the family Sesiidae. The species was first described by Thaddeus William Harris in 1839. It is widespread in the United States, mainly in the east and along the Pacific Coast, ranging north into the southern parts of Canada. It is an introduced species in Hawaii.

The wingspan is 20–35 mm. Adults are on wing from July to September and are active during the day. Adults have a black body with some yellow streaking and four or more narrow yellow bands around the abdomen. The wings, where scaled, are dark olive and red brown, and there is a prominent dark bar.

The larvae feed on Rubus species. They bore in the rootstock and root crowns of their host plant.

The complete life cycle requires two years in most cases, although some complete in a single year.

External links

Sesiidae